Fred John Hageman (born June 30, 1937) was an American football linebacker in the National Football League for the Washington Redskins.  He played college football at the University of Arkansas and University of Kansas, and was drafted in the 2nd round in 1959 by the Oakland Raiders but did not report and returned to Kansas to finish his undergraduate degree and play out his senior season where he was a 2 time All Big 8 selection as a center and middle linebacker.  He was a Tri-Captain and played in 4 post season games including the College All-Star game with numerous All Americans.  Was drafted in the 7th round of the 1960 NFL Draft by the New York Giants and was immediately traded to Washington for cash and a high draft pick.  He was the "Tribe's" defensive leader and starting middle linebacker upon reporting to camp.  He was a runner-up for Rookie of the Year as a middle linebacker and played more minutes than any other player in the NFL in 1961.  After his first stellar season, he was moved to starting Center where he played at an elite level.  He was traded to the Chicago Bears in 1965, where he was injured in a pre-season game.  Although urged to return by many, Fred returned to Kansas and earned his master's degree in education.  He went on to a very successful business career.  The "gentle giant" at a huge 6 foot 5 and 255 pounds of solid muscle with world class speed, Fred was named as Kansas University's "Center of the Century" and was named to its first team "All-Time KU Football Team" along with the likes of Gayle Sayers, John Hadl and other NFL greats.  Known as "Pappy" to many, he led KU's team, to a #2 Ranking and a Big 8 Championship in 1960.  Some believe the teams he led in 1959 and 1960, along with John Hadl, were the best in KU's history.  Fred was enshrined in the Batesville, Arkansas Area Sports Hall of Fame in 1992.  He was the first All-State Athlete at Batesville, H.S.

1937 births
2012 deaths
American football linebackers
American football centers
Washington Redskins players
Chicago Bears players
People from Bunkie, Louisiana
Players of American football from Louisiana
Arkansas Razorbacks football players
Kansas Jayhawks football players